Python brongersmai is a species of nonvenomous snake in the family Pythonidae.  The species is native to Southeast Asia.

Common names
Common names for P. brongersmai include blood python, Brongersma's short-tailed python, Malaysian blood python, red blood python, red short-tailed python, and Sumatran blood python.

Etymology
The specific name, brongersmai, is in honor of Dutch herpetologist Leo Brongersma.

Geographic range
P. brongersmai is found in peninsular (Western) Malaysia, Sumatra east of the central dividing range of mountains, Bangka Island and other islands in the Strait of Malacca, including the Lingga Islands, Riau islands, and Pinang, Thailand, and Vietnam.

Habitat

Behaviour
Python brongersmai is a primarily crepuscular species (usually active around dawn and dusk).

Size
These snakes generally look overweight due to their robust structure.

Lifespan
P. brongersmai can live up to about 20 years in captivity.

Coloration
The color pattern of P. brongersmai consists of rich, bright red to orange to a duller rusty red ground color, although populations with yellow and brown are known. This is overlaid with yellow and tan blotches and stripes that run the length of the body, as well as tan and black spots that extend up the flanks. The belly is white, often with small black markings. The head is usually a shade of grey; individual snakes can change how light and dark the head is. A white postocular stripe runs down and back from the posterior edge of the eye.

Reproduction
Python brongersmai is oviparous, with up to 30 eggs being laid at a time. The female coils around her eggs and shivers her body, producing heat to incubate the eggs properly.

Commercial trade
Once widely considered to be generally unpredictable and aggressive, P. brongersmai is gradually becoming more common among herpetoculturists. Formerly, many of the specimens in captivity were wild-caught adults from Malaysia. These are known to be more aggressive than those from Indonesia (Sumatra), from which most of the wild-caught, wild-bred, and captive-bred stock are now descended. Captive-raised juveniles generally become mild-tempered, somewhat-predictable adults. This, combined with several new brightly colored captive bloodlines, is helping to boost the popularity of these much-maligned snakes among reptile hobbyists.

Python brongersmai is part of a commercial harvest for leather. There is evidence to suggest that there are clear indications of misdeclared, underreported and illegal trade involving tens of thousands of blood pythons, and there are questions whether this trade is sustainable

Taxonomy
This species was first described by Olive Griffith Stull in 1938 as Python curtus brongersmai, a subspecies of Python curtus. This taxon has since been elevated and recognised as a full species, Python brongersmai,  by Pauwels et al. (2000).

References

Further reading
Barker, Dave; Barker, Tracy (November 2007). "Blood Pythons". Reptiles Magazine. Bowtie Publishing.
McDiarmid RW, Campbell JA, Touré TA (1999). Snake Species of the World: A Taxonomic and Geographic Reference, Volume 1. Washington, District of Columbia: Herpetologists' League. 511 pp.  (series).  (volume).
Pauwels OSG, Laohawat O-A, David P, Bour R, Dangsee P, Puangjit C, Chimsunchart C (2000). "Herpetological investigations in Phang-Nga Province, southern Peninsular Thailand, with a list of reptile species and notes on their biology". Dumerilia 4 (2): 123-154. (Python brongersmai, p. 138).
Shine R, Ambariyanto, Harlow PS, Mumpuni (1999). "Ecological attributes of two commercially harvested Python species in Northern Sumatra". Journal of Herpetology 33 (2): 249-257. (Python brongersmai, new combination).

External links

Herp Radio at Herp Herp Hooray. Accessed 15 January 2013.
Blood Python Care at Bloody Pythons By: David Weimert. Accessed 15 January 2013.

brongersmai
Reptiles described in 1938
Taxa named by Olive Griffith Stull